Algirdas Kumža (born 29 November 1956) is a Lithuanian politician, born in  Palūkštis. In 1990 he was among those who signed the Act of the Re-Establishment of the State of Lithuania. He was the ambassador to Ukraine from 2006 to 2010.

References

1956 births
Living people
People from Telšiai District Municipality
Lithuanian politicians
Lithuanian jurists
Ambassadors of Lithuania to Ukraine
Communist Party of the Soviet Union members
Academic staff of Vilnius University